An American Portrait is a series of historical interstitial programs that aired on CBS from September 9, 1984, until October 28, 1986. Each episode opened with the centennial introduction In Celebration: 1886–1986, followed by a one-minute biography of the subject. Each episode was presented by a different celebrity.

List of episodes

Season 1

Season 2

References

External links
 

1980s American documentary television series
1984 American television series debuts
1986 American television series endings
CBS original programming
Historical television series
Interstitial television shows